The HP-10B (F1636A) is a student business calculator introduced in 1987. The model of this calculator proved to compete well with the higher end RPN HP-12C.

Two versions of the 10B were produced, the first version came with orange lettering around the keys and used an 1LU7 HP Saturn processor, the later model (in 2000) with teal-green labels. The functionality of the two versions appears to be identical.

The successor HP 10bII (F1902A), which was introduced in 2001, is essentially a cosmetic upgrade offering the same overall functionality, but actually reduces the available numbered-storage registers from 15 to 10. Early production runs were of poor quality; newer calculators have apparently solved this shortcoming.

In 2011, the 10bII was replaced by the HP 10bII+ (NW239AA) model 1 (codenamed "Bluestar") with expanded capabilities. This model also allows chain input. The 10bII+ uses a flashable Atmel AT91SAM7L128 processor with ARM7TDMI core.

In 2015, the internal hardware of the HP 10bII+ changed to use an Atmel ATSAM4LC2CA processor with ARM Cortex-M4 core. The part number and physical appearance of model 2 didn't change except for a "Rev 2" plate on the bottom side. The serial numbers of the new model start with "PHA". The 2×3-pin flash port now uses the USB protocol instead of a TTL serial protocol.

None of the five models supports RPN.

See also
 List of Hewlett-Packard products: Pocket calculators
 HP calculators

References

External links
HP-10B and HP-10BII pictures on MyCalcDB (database about 1970s and 1980s pocket calculators)

10B
10B